Dr. Raymond Langston is a fictional character on the CBS crime drama CSI: Crime Scene Investigation, portrayed by Laurence Fishburne. He joined the show in season 9, after the departure of Gil Grissom, played by William Petersen.  His last name is taken from Fishburne's son, Langston, who was named after the African-American writer Langston Hughes.

He appeared in 59 of the 60 episodes between the middle of season 9 and the end of season 11, the exception being "418/427" from season 11.

In June 2011, it was announced that Fishburne did not renew his contract with the show, making the season 11 finale his final appearance.

Background
Raymond was an Army brat born in Seoul, South Korea, and consequently calls the sport of soccer by its more widely recognized name, football.  His father, a decorated soldier and a veteran of the Korean War, was a violent man, often involved in brawls off the battlefield; as a result, Langston's childhood was a painful one. Raymond eventually obtained a medical degree and became a pathologist at a Delaware hospital. A co-worker at his hospital was an Angel of Death, murdering 27 patients. While Langston saw the evidence, he was never able to put it together. He ultimately wrote a book about the experiences, titled In Front of my Eyes, which was read by not only Gil Grissom but also Archie Johnson and Dr. Tom Loman (of CSI: Miami).

Afterward, Langston became a professor at West Las Vegas University, but continued to do pro bono work as a surgeon. It was in this capacity that he came into contact with the CSI team, as they were investigating a series of murders attributed to serial killer Nate Haskell, whom Langston interviewed for the course. After the case's conclusion, Grissom encouraged Langston to join the Las Vegas Crime Lab as a Level 1 investigator.

Career as a CSI
In the Season 9 episode "The Grave Shift", Langston began his first day on the job. His first day was troubling for him, as he overdusted a print and ruined it, dropped a burned body and tore its shirt, got his necktie stuck in the victim's blood (causing it to become evidence), and drew Riley Adams's criticism when he reprimanded a man who struck his son. He also received a cold welcome from David Hodges, who was still unhappy about Gil Grissom's departure, but who warms up to Langston after the latter demonstrates a cornmeal bomb. Nevertheless, the team accepts him as one of their own, inviting him to join them at a dinner. The episode ends with Langston staying late and practicing dusting with his own prints.

In later episodes, it is revealed that Langston has a number of interests, including blues music, and quickly befriended the like-minded Doc Al Robbins. In "Deep Fried and Minty Fresh", it is revealed Langston knows some Mandarin Chinese. He demonstrates a knowledge and skill in the use of firearms.  He is the only member of the team who rides a motorcycle to work.

Langston, despite his calm demeanor, occasionally takes cases personally. In his first case, he reprimanded a father for shouting at his son while the team was searching the boy's room, earning a reprimand from Riley about keeping an emotional distance. In "Mascara", one of his former students who was planning on joining CSI is killed, and Langston attacks the suspects when he blames it on a god. He was forced to kill a suspect in self-defense in the Season 9 finale, "All In"; his lack of guilt over the event worries him. It was the first time he had taken a life in the line of duty. In episode "No Way Out", he and fellow CSI Riley Adams are held hostage in the aftermath of a shootout in a quiet Las Vegas neighborhood in which Riley was able to disarm the suspect.

By the Season 10 premiere episode, Langston has taken numerous courses (going so far as to max out the hours the lab will pay for and paying out of his own pocket) and has since been promoted to CSI Level 2, as well as to being cleared of suspicion from the events of "All In". As seen in "Sin City Blue", he refused to give his DNA to the Crime Lab to clear himself from the investigation; the reason why is later speculated on by Wendy Simms and David Hodges in "Doctor Who", though the two draw no concrete conclusions. In the episode "All That Cremains", it is revealed that he was once married to a woman named Gloria; yet it is known from the CSI: NY Season 6 episode "Hammer Down", he had no children with her. She arrives at the Crime Lab to tell Ray she is getting married and invites him to the wedding. She asks Ray to come to dinner where he will meet her future husband. He said that he would think about it, but he does arrive at dinner to meet them. At the end of the episode, he gets dressed up and Nick Stokes notices that he is still wearing his wedding ring. Nick suggests that Ray not wear it at the wedding. After Nick leaves, Ray takes his ring off, puts it in his locker, and leaves for the wedding.

Trouble with Nate Haskell
Serial killer Nate Haskell first appears in the Season 9 episode "19 Down", the first part of the final episode of Gil Grissom, the former supervisor of the crime lab. Langston was a professor of forensics and taught a class in college. Grissom comes to one of his classes, which is when Haskell is mentioned. After Langston became a CSI following Grissom's retirement, Haskell emerges again when he calls Langston in the first part of the Season 10 finale "Doctor Who."

At the conclusion of Season 10 ("Meat Jekyll"), Langston is stabbed by Haskell in the closing minutes of the second part of the finale and collapses to the ground, bleeding.

In the eleventh-season premiere, Ray survives the attack but has lost one of his kidneys as a result and regularly needs a cane to help him although in later episodes, he seems to be fully capable of walking without it.

Later in the episode "Bump and Grind", Langston receives a letter from Haskell, where he finds a kidney bean and note that says, "Just thinking about you, XO, Nate". In the end of the episode, he looks at the scars that Haskell gave him and Sara Sidle walks in. He tells her about the letter that Haskell sent him, and Sara tells him to not let Haskell get in his head.

Later in the episode "Targets of Obsession", Langston goes to court to testify against Haskell. During the trial, Haskell contends that he is a victim of his own circumstances. As a child, he was abused by his alcoholic father, and he is also a carrier of the MAO-A gene, which has been shown to predispose an individual to violent behavior. When Langston takes the stand, Haskell forces him to recount in full detail the attack at the crime lab. At first, it appears that the jury has been swayed by Haskell's testimony; however, near the close of the case, Langston returns to the stand to rebuke Haskell's MAO-A defense. When Haskell questions Langston's ability to testify on the matter, Langston reveals that he is personally equipped to discuss the influence of the MAO-A gene on a person's behavior. Like Haskell, Langston reveals, he too was abused by an alcoholic father and has the MAO-A gene. The fact that Langston has avoided becoming a criminal himself and instead takes pleasure in seeing criminals being brought to justice proves for the court that neither abuse nor the MAO-A gene can determine a person's behavior, and Haskell is found guilty.

Haskell sends a signal to his fiancée, which Langston notices while the verdict was being read. As Langston was leaving to go home after his success in court, he sees the group of women that tried to free Haskell through his defenses and becomes suspicious when he doesn't see Haskell's fiancée nor a certain other woman. He remembers the signal sent and quickly returns to the prison where Haskell was being held, and finds that there was another inmate wearing Nate Haskell's prison band. It is later shown that Haskell's fiancée helped him escape by killing the other inmates, the other prison guards, and the woman that helped her.

In the episode "Unleashed", Ray reveals to Lady Heather, that when he was applying for medical school, he was asked why he wanted to be a doctor. He responded with as long as he was helping people, he was not hurting them. Lady Heather remarks that his ugly side will be the one to catch Haskell. Ray replies that his ugly side won't catch Haskell, but instead kill him.

In the episode "Father of the Bride", Ray and the team receive a video of Haskell. It showed his fiancée, Vivian, who helped him escape, and it appeared to be a ransom video. In the Season 11 finale, Langston snaps after Haskell kidnaps Ray's ex-wife Gloria and hints that he (Haskell) sexually assaulted her. While rescuing Gloria, Langston defeats Haskell in a fight and then beats him multiple times, using his medical knowledge to inflict as much damage as possible to Haskell. He damages Haskell's kidney in retaliation, and breaks his knee. After a series of beatings, Ray throws Haskell over a railing killing him. Captain Jim Brass is the first officer to arrive at the crime scene.  After seeing what Haskell did to Gloria, Captain Brass writes up Haskell's death as justifiable homicide by Ray in defense of Gloria's and his own life.  Brass then ensures that the evidence at the crime scene supports his report.   Catherine sends in the report to Internal Affairs saying the evidence supports that he acted in self-defense. At the end of the episode, Internal Affairs interviews him, and asks if he killed Haskell in self-defense or murdered him. The episode abruptly ends.

In the Season 12 premiere, "73 Seconds", Brass and Doc Robbins mention that Ray is back in Baltimore with Gloria, and Doc Robbins tells Brass that killing Haskell was probably the best thing for Ray, as it saved his life.

Though Ray was not formally charged by IA, he was pressured into resigning from the team, and almost all of the CSIs involved were affected in some way; Catherine Willows and Nick Stokes were stripped of their positions of graveyard shift supervisor and assistant supervisor, respectively, because of the team's attempt to shield Ray and for not bringing Ray into line during his attempt to find Haskell.

Relationships with colleagues
When Langston first joined, he was warmly received by the team and has a good working relationship with them. When it comes to analyzing evidence and the science, he sometimes acts as a mentor to the likes of Nick (who first gives him the title "Doctor Ray") and Greg, telling them the little-known or weird facts. Hodges, who initially seemed to dislike him, eventually warmed up to his new colleague. He notably developed a friendship with Doc Robbins and the two are often seen in the morgue exchanging banter over the corpse they are examining, as well as discussing their mutual love for the Blues.

Relationships with other series

Laurence Fishburne made guest appearances as Dr. Raymond Langston in CSI: Miami and CSI: NY in the tenth season of CSI, appearing in episodes aired the week of November 9, 2009. This gives him the distinction of being one of only four actors from the main cast of one CSI program to appear in the same role on three CSI branded series. The other three actors are Ted Danson as Director D.B. Russell, David Caruso as Lieutenant Horatio Caine, and Gary Sinise as Detective Mac Taylor.

References

CSI: Crime Scene Investigation characters
Fictional physicians
Fictional forensic scientists
Fictional writers
Fictional pathologists
Television characters introduced in 2008
Fictional African-American people
Crossover characters in television

nl:Dr. Raymond Langston